The Iron Ring is a 1997 fantasy novel for children by American author Lloyd Alexander. It features a young king Tamar who leaves Sundari Palace on a quest in a land of humans and talking animals, which are inspired by Indian mythology. The caste system of India is one ground for conflict in the novel.

The book includes an author's note, a list of characters and places, a map, and a glossary with 27 entries, from acharya to suta.

Origins
In the author's note, a preface, Alexander acknowledges that "mythology of ancient India has always delighted and fascinated me—but, at first, in bits and pieces"; later, he studied it. He explains one term from the glossary: "Dharma, the driving force of the present tale". The Iron Ring is not "a picture of India some thousands of years ago" or a retelling of Indian stories, although it "evokes the atmosphere, themes, and concerns threading through Indian literature".

As a boy, Alexander "loved all the world's mythologies";
"the King Arthur stories, fairy tales, mythology—things like that".
His publisher attributes inspiration for many of his books to "the world's mythologies".

Plot
The narrative consists of 36 chapters, in four parts.

Part II: In the Forest
The party arrives in Muktara to engage in durbar with King Bala, only to find that Nahusha is already there. There is nearly a violent confrontation between Ashwara and Nahusha, before Bala restores order to the durbar. Nahusha is a hateful man with no respect for anyone save himself, not even for the revered brahmana. He reveals that one of Hashkat's faithful subjects, Akka, has been captured and cruelly enslaved for Nahusha's amusement. Finally, Bala reaches the decision that he will take neither side in the struggle, giving neither military support to Nahusha nor protection to Ashwara.

They leave the city cautiously, as Bala has warned Ashwara that Nahusha will only be unable to harm him inside Muktara, and are charged by a large talking elephant named Arvati, who ran into them while fleeing from her captors. Adi-Kavi has a plan for dealing with the approaching soldiers who are trying to recapture Arvati. He ties up Hashkat and paints him with mud. When the hunters arrive, Adi-Kavi claims that the elephant was actually a demonic rakshasa. He gets them to fall into a net trap to avoid being killed by the false demon.

Part III: Ranapura

Part IV: Jaya

See also
Mythology
Indian epic poetry
Vedic mythology
Hindu mythology
Buddhist mythology

References

External links

Novels by Lloyd Alexander
1997 American novels
Children's fantasy novels
American fantasy novels
American children's novels
Dutton Penguin books
1997 children's books